The Norwegian Cycling Federation or NCF (In Norwegian: Norges Cykleforbund) is the national governing body of cycle racing in Norway.

The NCF is a member of the UCI and the UEC.

External links
 Norwegian Cycling Federation official website

National members of the European Cycling Union
Cycle racing organizations
Cycling
Cycle racing in Norway